Nicole Marie Appleton (born 7 December 1974) is a Canadian singer and television presenter. She is a member of the British girl group All Saints and Canadian duo Appleton with her elder sister Natalie Appleton.

Early life 
Appleton was born in Hamilton, Ontario, to Jewish parents Mary and Kenneth Appleton. She is the youngest of four daughters. She has three older sisters; Lori, Lee, and Natalie. While growing up she lived in Toronto, New York City, and London.

Career

1996–2001: Career with All Saints 

In 1996 Appleton and her sister Natalie Appleton became the third and fourth members of the group All Saints, formed by Melanie Blatt and Shaznay Lewis. All Saints released their debut single "I Know Where It's At" in 1997 via London Records and reached number four on the UK Singles Chart. Their second single Never Ever was released in November 1997, and introduced the group to international success, reaching the top ten in several countries as well as peaking at number one in the United Kingdom and Australia. It sold over 1.2 million copies in the UK and was eventually certified double platinum by the British Phonographic Industry. In 1998 the group won two BRIT Awards for "Best British Single" and "Best British Video", both for Never Ever. They released their debut album All Saints in November 1997, it reached number two in the UK and was certified five-times platinum by the BPI for sales of 1.5 million. The third single from the album was the double A-side "Under the Bridge / Lady Marmalade", which became their second UK number-one single. "Bootie Call", the fourth single, also went to number one, and the silver-certified "War of Nerves", the fifth and final release, peaked at number seven. The album achieved success in countries such as Australia, Canada and the United States, where All Saints was certified platinum by the RIAA for sales of one million and produced two top forty singles on the Billboard Hot 100: "I Know Where It's At" and "Never Ever".

In February 2000 they released the single "Pure Shores" for the soundtrack of the film The Beach (starring Leonardo DiCaprio). "Pure Shores" was their fourth number-one single in the UK and the second best-selling single of 2000, with 600,000 copies sold; it also became their first and only number-one single in Ireland and was a substantial hit across Europe and Australia. In October 2000, All Saints released the single "Black Coffee", which became their fifth and final number-one single in the UK, selling 200,000 copies. Also in 2000, Nicole and her sister both appeared in the film Honest.  This preceded their second studio album, Saints & Sinners, which debuted at number one on the UK Albums Chart, eventually reaching double-platinum certification in the UK for sales of 600,000 copies. The second and final single was "All Hooked Up" in January 2001, which peaked at number seven. In February 2001, All Saints announced that they were to take a break so that they "could clear the air between themselves". In November 2001, London Records released a greatest hits compilation entitled All Hits and disband.

2002–2005: Career with Appleton 
In September 2002, Nicole and her sister Natalie launched themselves back onto the music scene, with their first single "Fantasy" written with Andy Hayman and Gareth Young reaching No. 2 in the UK Singles Chart. Their autobiography, Together, came out in October 2002. In 2003, they had two more hits with "Don't Worry" and "Everything Eventually" and the album, Everything's Eventual which went gold in the UK after just two months. They decided to sign a deal with Concept Music in late 2004 because of differences with their previous label, Polydor.

2006–2007: All Saints reunion 
On 24 January 2006, it was announced that the group had reformed and signed a record deal with Parlophone. They subsequently began work on their third studio album, Studio 1. The first single, "Rock Steady" (released in November 2006), reached number three on the UK Singles Chart. Studio 1 entered the albums chart at number forty and sold 60,000 copies according to the BPI, being certified silver. A second single, "Chick Fit" failed to reach the top 200.

2007–2013: Television 
Since 2007 Nicole has been a host of the TV show The Hot Desk. She is also the host of Cover Me Canada, a Canadian reality singing competition that debuted on CBC Television on 18 September 2011.

2014–present: Second All Saints reunion 
In 2014, All Saints reformed to support the Backstreet Boys for five dates across the UK and Ireland in 2014. On 27 January 2016, it was confirmed that All Saints will release their fourth studio album Red Flag on 8 April 2016. The lead single from the album, "One Strike", preceded the album on 28 February 2016.

Personal life 
On 7 December 1997, Appleton met Robbie Williams while filming Top of the Pops. A relationship began, and they were subsequently engaged. In an autobiography she co-authored with her sister Natalie, Appleton later revealed that she aborted her and Williams' baby after pressure from her record company.

In 2000, Appleton started a relationship with Liam Gallagher, the frontman of the group Oasis. She gave birth to their son, Gene Gallagher, on 2 July 2001. Gallagher recorded the song "Songbird" as a token of his love for Appleton. The couple married at Marylebone Town Hall in London on the morning of 14 February 2008.

In April 2014, the couple divorced after the media revealed Liam Gallagher was expecting a child with journalist and The New York Times freelancer Liza Ghorbani.

In March 2020, Appleton announced she had given birth to a daughter with her boyfriend Stephen Haines. Appleton and Haines married in October 2021.

Filmography

Discography

References

External links 
 

1974 births
Living people
Actresses from Hamilton, Ontario
All Saints (group) members
Alumni of the Sylvia Young Theatre School
Canadian singer-songwriters
Canadian people of English descent
Canadian film actresses
Canadian television actresses
Jewish Canadian actresses
Jewish Canadian musicians
Jewish women singers
Musicians from Hamilton, Ontario
Canadian expatriates in England
Canadian expatriates in the United States
Canadian women pop singers
21st-century Canadian women singers
Feminist musicians